Atif Aslam is a Pakistani pop, rock, film and playback singer, songwriter, composer and an actor. His discography consists of three studio albums, songs from Pakistani films, Hindi films and Hollywood films, and many other popular songs. He predominantly sings  in (Urdu) and Punjabi. He has also sung a song in Bengali. He also recited Adhan and Asma-ul-Husna in 2020.

Albums

Pakistan film songs

TV series

Hindi film songs

Replaced film songs

Punjabi film songs

Bengali film songs

Hollywood films

Singles

Coke Studio (Pakistan)

Pakistani songs

Other music videos

TV commercials

Extra notes

See also 
 Nusrat Fateh Ali Khan discography
 Rahat Fateh Ali Khan discography
 Ali Zafar discography
 Sahir Ali Bagga discography
 List of awards and nominations received by Atif Aslam

References

External links 
 
 

Discographies of Pakistani artists
Discography
Rock music discographies
Pop music discographies